Sergei Vladimirovich Ignatyev (born 9 December 1986) is a Russian professional football player.

Career
He made his Russian Premier League debut for FC Arsenal Tula on 2 August 2014 in a game against FC Zenit Saint Petersburg.

In January 2015, Ignatyev signed for Kazakhstan Premier League side FC Irtysh Pavlodar.

References

External links
 
 

1986 births
Sportspeople from Chelyabinsk
Living people
Russian footballers
Russian expatriate footballers
FC Sibir Novosibirsk players
FC Baltika Kaliningrad players
FC Tyumen players
FC Arsenal Tula players
FC Irtysh Pavlodar players
Russian Premier League players
Expatriate footballers in Kazakhstan
Association football utility players
FC Torpedo Vladimir players
FC Spartak Nizhny Novgorod players